Congost may refer to
Congost (river) in Spain
Congost (surname)
Pavelló Nou Congost, indoor sports arena in Spain